Kopp may refer to:

 Kopp (surname), a surname
 Kopp, Germany, a municipality in Rhineland-Palatinate, Germany
 Kopp, Virginia, an extinct unincorporated community in Prince William County, Virginia, United States
 Kopp Verlag, a German nonfiction publisher specializing in conspiracy theories
 Kopp Glass, Inc., an American glass molding company

See also
 
 Kopps, a 2003 Swedish film
 Spion Kop (disambiguation)
 Cop (disambiguation)
 Copp (disambiguation)
 Kapp (disambiguation)